Kōji Chino is Japanese film director.

Filmography
Bonta No Kekkon Ya
Thway (2003)

References 

Japanese film directors
Living people
Year of birth missing (living people)
Place of birth missing (living people)